Castañar de Ibor is a municipality located in the province of Cáceres, Extremadura, Spain. According to the 2005 census (INE), it has a population of 1,182.

See also
 Extremaduran language

References

Municipalities in the Province of Cáceres